All Saints' Flood is the name of different floods throughout history:

 All Saints' Flood (1170) (Allerheiligenvloed), 1170 AD in the Netherlands
 All Saints' Flood (1304) (Allerheiligenflut), 1304 AD in Western Pomerania
 All Saints' Flood (1436) (Allerheiligenflut), 1436 AD in North Frisia
 All Saints' Flood (1570) (Allerheiligenvloed), 1570 AD in the Netherlands